Monaco Statistics (or IMSEE) is the statistics agency of Monaco. The agency was stablished in 2011 to serve as an information service and to provide indicators for monitoring the economic and social development of the principality. 

As of 2021, its director is Sophie Vincent.

References

External links

2011 establishments in Monaco
Monaco
Demographics of Monaco
Government of Monaco